Shane Taylor is a British - American actor, known for appearing in the miniseries Band of Brothers and the serial Strike Back: Vengeance.

Career
Taylor co-starred in the British-American miniseries Band of Brothers as the Louisianan medic Eugene Roe. Though a relatively minor character in the series, the sixth installment "Bastogne" is set from Roe's perspective and features him as the episode's central protagonist, as he struggles to help the men while they endure frigid conditions, low supplies, and constant enemy fire. Taylor's performance was praised as "a marvel of economy" by Emily VanDerWerff of The A.V. Club, who stated: "Watch how little he moves or speaks, unless he absolutely needs to... He's exactly the right man for this part and for the way that Roe's long slog through this siege begins to feel like an unending nightmare".

In 2009, Taylor starred in the British dark comedy film Bomber as a character who accompanies his elderly father (Benjamin Whitrow) to Germany, as the old man wishes to atone for his actions during World War II. In Strike Back: Vengeance, which aired in 2012, Taylor guest starred as a ruthless mercenary. He described his character as "a mad, bad, crazy lad" and former colleague of Stonebridge (Philip Winchester). While filming his action scenes, Taylor sustained a black eye after accidentally coming into contact with Winchester. Taylor also cracked his rib, causing them to delay filming his final big action scene until the last day of shooting. In 2013, he co-starred in the film Walking with the Enemy.

Select filmography
 All Along the Watchtower (1999)
 Where the Heart Is (1999)
 Dangerfield (1999)
 King of the Bingo Game (short) (1999)
 Room to Rent (2000)
 P.O.V. (2000)
 Band of Brothers (2001)
 Comedy Lab (2004)
 Shinobido (video game) (2005)
 Bomber (2009)
 The Day of the Triffids (2009)
 Devil's Playground (2010)
 Strike Back: Vengeance (2012)
 Walking with the Enemy (2013)
 Quirke (2014)
 Sons of Liberty (2015)
 Hunter Killer (2018)
 The Exorcism of Karen Walker (2018)

References

External links 

British male actors
Living people
1974 births